Mark Robert Bowden  (born July 17, 1951) is an American journalist and writer. He is a national correspondent for The Atlantic. He is best known for his book Black Hawk Down: A Story of Modern War (1999) about the 1993 U.S. military raid in Mogadishu, Somalia. It was adapted as a motion picture of the same name that received two Academy Awards.

Bowden is also known for Killing Pablo: The Hunt for the World's Greatest Outlaw (2001) about the efforts to take down Pablo Escobar, a Colombian drug lord.

Early life

Born in 1951 in St. Louis, Missouri; Bowden is a 1973 graduate of Loyola University Maryland. While he was at college, he was inspired to embark on a career in journalism by reading Tom Wolfe's book The Electric Kool-Aid Acid Test.

He currently lives in Kennett Square, Pennsylvania, the Mushroom Capital of the World.

Career
From 1979 to 2003, Bowden was a staff writer for The Philadelphia Inquirer.  In that role he researched and wrote Black Hawk Down and Killing Pablo, both of which appeared as lengthy serials in the newspaper before being published as books. He published two books prior to these, Doctor Dealer and Bringing the Heat, both of which were based on reporting he originally did for the newspaper. He has since published nine other books. Bowden wrote the 1997 Playboy interview of Donald Trump.

Bowden is a contributing writer for The Atlantic, and has contributed to Vanity Fair, The New Yorker, Men's Journal,  Sports Illustrated, Air Mail, Business Insider, and Rolling Stone.

He has taught journalism and creative writing at Loyola University Maryland, and was Distinguished Writer in Residence at the University of Delaware from 2013 to 2017.

Former Florida State Seminoles football coach Bobby Bowden is his first cousin once removed.

Criticism
From June 2012 through March 2013, the legal blog Trials & Tribulations (T&T), which reports on California trials and legal affairs, ran a seven-part series titled "Fact Checking Mark Bowden's Curious Vanity Fair Article on Stephanie Lazarus". This series disputes elements of Bowden's July 2012 Vanity Fair article, "A Case So Cold It Was Blue". The author suggests that Bowden may have created quotes and states of mind of principals to fit his story, and questions whether the journalist had conducted relevant interviews or attended a single day of the murder trial of former LAPD detective Stephanie Lazarus, although this case was the centerpiece of his story.

Part VI of the series, published on T&T in October 2012, noted that Cullen Murphy, Bowden's editor at Vanity Fair, declined to comment on the record to the blog's author about the allegations related to Bowden's article.  Part VII, published in March 2013, said that Bowden, who was not approached about the blog's allegations prior to their posting, had since declined to respond to questions posed by the website's blogger regarding his article. He has said that he welcomes questions about it from others.

Poynter Journalism School blog posted an extended analysis of the dispute by Craig Silverman, noting that Vanity Fair had posted a correction to the article, and that "the discrepancies [noted by T&T] don't amount to quote manipulation or a misrepresentation of what was said." Vanity Fair editor Cullen Murphy, in an e-mail to Poynter, said in part "the quotations used in Bowden's text correspond with relevant portions of the video. Some things are hard to make out, and there may be an occasional small variance, but a fair reading would conclude that the quotes track accurately and correctly capture the dynamic of the interrogation. There has been no distortion." Silverman closes by listing three takeaways for newsrooms, one of which is, "Whether or not you like the tone or approach taken by an outside critic, you still have a responsibility to examine claims of factual error or ethical malfeasance," and he notes further that it might have been easier for T&T and Vanity Fair to deal with the issue if they had spoken to one another directly.

Personal views

On coercive interrogation and torture 
In the October 2003 issue of The Atlantic, Bowden's article "The Dark Art of Interrogation" advocated an official ban on all forms of "coercive" interrogation but argued that they should still be practiced in secret and should go unpunished if revealed. Written more than a year before the violations of prisoners were revealed at Abu Ghraib and other detention centers, he wrote, in part:

The Bush Administration has adopted exactly the right posture on the matter. Candor and consistency are not always public virtues. Torture is a crime against humanity, but coercion is an issue that is rightly handled with a wink, or even a touch of hypocrisy; it should be banned but also quietly practiced. Those who protest coercive methods will exaggerate their horrors, which is good: it generates a useful climate of fear. It is wise of the President to reiterate U.S. support for international agreements banning torture, and it is wise for American interrogators to employ whatever coercive methods work. It is also smart not to discuss the matter with anyone.

If interrogators step over the line from coercion to outright torture, they should be held personally responsible. But no interrogator is ever going to be prosecuted for keeping Khalid Sheikh Mohammed awake, cold, alone, and uncomfortable. Nor should he be.

In The Men Who Stare at Goats by Jon Ronson, Bowden's article was noted as a reference to the CIA's Project ARTICHOKE. This program developed physical methods that can be used during interrogations and Ronson noted that they can be brutal or fatal.

Future of the media 
Bowden believes that young people are just as drawn to "deep" journalism as other generations of people have been. He said in March 2009: "Nothing will ever replace language as the medium of thought, so nothing will replace the well-written, originally-reported story, or the well-reasoned essay."

Awards

 Winner Overseas Press Club's Cornelius Ryan Award for the best book of 2001 (for Killing Pablo)
 1997 Winner, Overseas Press Club's Hal Boyle Award for "best reporting from abroad" (for articles published in The Philadelphia Inquirer about the Battle of Mogadishu
 1999, finalist, National Book Award for Black Hawk Down
 Winner, Feature writing award from the Sunday Magazine Editors Association, 1987 (for Finder's Keeper's)
 Winner, Science Writing Award from the American Association for the Advancement of Science, 1980
 Finalist, best newspaper writing, American Society of Newspaper Editors, 1979 (for Life in the Projects)
 Winner, Maryland Library Association's Maryland Author Award for nonfiction writing, 2011 (for body of work)
 Winner, Gen. Wallace Greene Award for nonfiction writing, USMC Heritage Foundation 2018 (for Hue 1968)
 Finalist, Los Angeles Times Book Award, History, 2018 (for Hue 1968)
 Finalist, The Andrew Carnegie Medal, Nonfiction, 2018 (for Hue 1968) 
 Inductee, The Cybersecurity Canon 2018 (for Worm)

Publications

 
 Bringing the Heat (1994), NFL, account of 1992 Philadelphia Eagles season, professional football
 , 1993 U.S. military raid in Mogadishu, Somalia
 
 ; Pablo Escobar, Colombian drug lord
 Our Finest Day: D-Day, June 6, 1944 (2002)
 Finders Keepers: The Story of a Man Who Found $1 Million (2002), Joey Coyle finds $1.2 million in cash
 Road Work : Among Tyrants, Heroes, Rogues, and Beasts (2006), collection of 20 non-fiction pieces
 , 1979 Iran hostage crisis
 The Best Game Ever: Giants vs. Colts, 1958, and the Birth of the Modern NFL (2008), about the 1958 NFL championship game; Bowden had assistance analyzing game film from Eagles' coach Andy Reid.
 Worm: The First Digital World War, about the Conficker computer worm (2011); first covered by Bowden in "The Enemy Within", The Atlantic (June 2010).
 The Finish: The Killing of Osama bin Laden, (2012 )
 The Three Battles of Wanat and Other True Stories (2016 )
 Hue 1968 (2017 )
 The Last Stone: A Masterpiece of Criminal Interrogation (2019 )
 The Steal: Attempt to Overturn the 2020 Election and the People Who Stopped It  co-authored with Matthew Teague. (2022 ISBN 978-0-8021-5995-3)
 "Life Sentence; The Brief and Tragic Career of Baltimore's Deadliest Gang Leader," (2023 )

Adapted for film 
 Article "The Joey Coyle Story" was adapted as Money for Nothing (1993) 
 Black Hawk Down (2001)
 The True Story of Killing Pablo (2002), adapted as a TV movie
 Essence of Combat: Making Black Hawk Down (2003) (video)
 The True Story of Black Hawk Down (2003) (TV)
 Guests of the Ayatollah, adapted as a 2006 TV movie  
 Stalking Jihad, adapted as a 2007 TV movie 
 Hue 1968: A Turning Point of the American War in Vietnam (2017), to be adapted for a TV series on the Vietnam War, to be directed by Michael Mann

References

External links
 
 Works by Mark Bowden at The Atlantic
 Works by Mark Bowden at Vanity Fair
 Philly.com Biography: Mark Bowden
 Atlantic Monthly Biography
 Interview on Guests of the Ayatollah at the Pritzker Military Museum & Library on June 7, 2006
 Bowden discusses The Finish at the Pritzker Military Museum & Library on December 12, 2012
 The Dark Art of Interrogation, The Atlantic Monthly, October 2003 retrieved September 12, 2010

 In Depth interview with Bowden, June 4, 2006

1951 births
Living people
American foreign policy writers
American male non-fiction writers
21st-century American historians
21st-century American male writers
American military writers
Writers from Missouri
Writers from Maryland
Writers from Pennsylvania
The Philadelphia Inquirer people
Loyola University Maryland alumni
The Atlantic (magazine) people
American magazine journalists
Carnegie Council for Ethics in International Affairs
American crime writers